The Battle of Love's Return is a 1971 American comedy film written, directed, produced, and starring Lloyd Kaufman, the co-founder of Troma Entertainment, his first major film after his student production The Girl Who Returned.

Plot
Abacrombie is a down-on-his-luck loser. Upon being fired from his job, he sets out on a quest to find himself, encountering a variety of oddball characters who only make it harder for him. Sooner or later, he stumbles upon the girl of his dreams, and he determines to overcome his stupidity and win her heart.

Reception
The film was favorably reviewed by Howard Thompson of the New York Times and Judith Crist of New York Magazine, who compared Kaufman to Woody Allen and Mel Brooks.

The worst review, however, came from Kaufman's father: when asked what his favorite part was, he responded "the part where Lloyd gets killed".

Home media
The film has never been released on DVD individually, but is included in its entirety (and as a deconstructed version) on Kaufman's instructional box set, Make Your Own Damn Movie!, and is included as an Easter Egg on The Sexy Box, a DVD boxset of Squeeze Play!, Waitress!, Stuck on You! and The First Turn-On!.

Production notes
Future directors Allan Moyle and Oliver Stone worked on the film as an A.D. and an actor, respectively.
During filming of the battle scene, which was shot in a meadow in the backyard of Kaufman's mother's house, a smoke bomb ignited a large patch of grass and grew out of control, almost destroying the neighbors' house before the fire department arrived just in time. Mrs. Kaufman was not pleased.
To promote the film, Kaufman and friends would run around New York City with a stencil of the film's logo and spraypaint it on streets and sidewalks.

See also
 List of American films of 1971

References

External links

 The Battle of Love's Return – at the Troma Entertainment movie database

1971 films
American independent films
Troma Entertainment films
1971 comedy films
Films directed by Lloyd Kaufman
1970s English-language films
1970s American films